Jules Gauthier (26 September 1892 – 15 December 1975) was a Liberal party member of the House of Commons of Canada. He became a notary by career.

Gauthier was educated at the Chicoutimi Seminary and at Université Laval where he received his degree in civil law (LLL). In 1942, he was mayor of Jonquière.

He was first elected to Parliament at the Lapointe riding in the 1949 general election. After serving one term, the 21st Canadian Parliament, Gauthier left the House of Commons and did not seek another term in the 1953 election.

References

External links
 

1892 births
Liberal Party of Canada MPs
Mayors of places in Quebec
Members of the House of Commons of Canada from Quebec
1975 deaths